Darcie N. McElwee (born 1973) is an American lawyer who is the United States Attorney for the District of Maine.

Education 

McElwee received her Bachelor of Arts from Bowdoin College in 1995 and her Juris Doctor from the University of Maine School of Law in 1998.

Career 

McElwee began her legal career as an assistant district attorney for the Penobscot and Piscataquis counties in Maine from 1998 to 2002. Between 2005 and 2008, McElwee was an adjunct professor of advanced trial advocacy at the University of Maine School of Law. From 2002 to 2021, she served as an Assistant United States Attorney in the United States Attorney's Office for the District of Maine. Since 2005, she has been the coordinator of Project Safe Neighborhoods.

U.S. attorney for the District of Maine 

On August 10, 2021, President Joe Biden nominated McElwee to be the United States attorney for the District of Maine. On September 30, 2021, her nomination was reported out of committee by voice vote. On October 5, 2021, her nomination was confirmed in the United States Senate by voice vote. On October 8, 2021, she was sworn in by Chief U.S. District Judge Jon D. Levy.

References

External links
 Biography at U.S. Department of Justice

1973 births
Living people
20th-century American women lawyers
20th-century American lawyers
21st-century American women lawyers
21st-century American lawyers
Assistant United States Attorneys
Bowdoin College alumni
County district attorneys in Maine
Lawyers from Portland, Maine
Maine lawyers
United States Attorneys for the District of Maine
University of Maine School of Law alumni
University of Maine School of Law faculty